Peter Krogh could refer to:

Peter Krogh (photographer) (born 1960), American photographer
Peter F. Krogh (born 1937), American academic and government official